Belly of the Sun is a studio album by American jazz singer Cassandra Wilson. It was released on the Blue Note label in 2002.

Background
The title of the CD comes from a line in "Only a Dream in Rio" that Wilson had translated to Yoruba "... just to hear what it sounded like and it was explained [to Wilson] that in the Yoruba translation you would say 'in the belly of the sun.'"

India.Arie is a guest vocalist on "Just Another Parade".

Recording was done in the Clarksdale, Mississippi, train station. Additional recording was done at Allairre Studios South, New York, NY.

Reception
J. D. Coniside of The Rolling Stone wrote: "With a voice as rich and caramel-y as Sarah Vaughan's, and a delivery as intimately conversational as Joni Mitchell's, Cassandra Wilson is the perfect jazz singer for people who don't particularly like jazz singing... Still, Belly of the Sun feels uncomfortably empty at points". David R. Adler of AllMusic stated: "Cassandra Wilson continues to move down a highly eclectic path on Belly of the Sun, the somewhat belated follow-up to Traveling Miles. While displaying a jazz singer's mastery of melodic nuance and improvisatory phrasing, Wilson draws on a variety of non-jazz idioms -- roots music, rock, Delta blues, country, soul -- to create a kind of earthy, intelligent pop with obvious crossover appeal".

Marshall Bowden of PopMatters commented: " If, despite all that, all you can worry about is whether Belly of the Sun is a "real" jazz album or not, it's your problem, not Cassandra's. The table has been set and the meal is a sumptuous one. Whether you partake or not is your gain or loss."

Track listing 
 "The Weight" (Robbie Robertson) – 6:05
 "Justice" (Cassandra Wilson) – 5:27
 "Darkness on the Delta" (Jay Livingston, Al J. Neiburg, Marty Symes) – 3:47
 "Waters of March" (Antônio Carlos Jobim) – 4:26
 "You Gotta Move" (Mississippi Fred McDowell) – 2:44
 "Only a Dream in Rio" (James Taylor) – 4:32
 "Just Another Parade" (Wilson) – 6:05
 "Wichita Lineman" (Jimmy Webb) – 5:48
 "Shelter from the Storm" (Bob Dylan) – 5:17
 "Drunk as Cooter Brown" (Wilson) – 4:58
 "Show Me a Love" (Jesse Robinson, Wilson) – 3:49
 "Road So Clear" (Rhonda Richmond) – 5:22
 "Hot Tamales" (Robert Johnson) – 1:43
 "Corcovado" (Antônio Carlos Jobim) (For Japan only)

There was a promotional version of this album distributed before the album was released that contained two extra tracks that were not included on the final release. The promotional copy has "Rock Me Baby" (B. B. King) After "Shelter from the Storm" and before "Cooter Brown", and "Little Lion" (Caetano Veloso) after "Cooter Brown" and before "Show Me a Love". The promotional version was a regular pressed and silk-screened disc (not a CD-R) and came in a cardboard sleeve and had no album artwork.

Personnel 
 Cassandra Wilson – vocals; surdo, guitar (6, 7)
 Marvin Sewell – guitars (1, 2, 6-14)
 Kevin Breit – mandolin, guitars, vocals, bouzouki, omnichord (1, 2, 5−10, 14)
 Mark Peterson – basses (1, 2, 6-12, 14)
 Jeffrey Haynes – percussion, plastic tub, steel pans (1, 2, 5-8, 10-14)
 Cyro Baptista – percussion, vocals (1, 2, 5-12, 14)
 Xavyon Jamison – drums (1, 2, 6, 11, 12)
Guest artists
 "Boogaloo" Ames – piano (3)
 Children of M.S.44 (NYC) – vocals (4)
 Rhonda Richmond – vocals, piano (5, 7, 12)
 Richard Johnston – guitar, vocals (5)
 Jewell Bass, Vasti Jackson, Patrice Moncell, Henry Rhodes – vocals (6)
 India.Arie – vocals (7)
 Jesse Robinson – electric guitar (11)
 Olu Dara – trumpet (12)

Chart positions

References 

2002 albums
Blue Note Records albums
Cassandra Wilson albums